Barm-e Siah Rudtalkh (also Romanized as Barm-e Sīāh Rūdtalkh; also known as Baram Seh and Barm-e Sīāh) is a village in Bahmai-ye Garmsiri-ye Shomali Rural District, Bahmai-ye Garmsiri District, Bahmai County, Kohgiluyeh and Boyer-Ahmad Province, Iran. At the 2006 census, its population was 36, in 8 families.

References 

Populated places in Bahmai County